Local elections were held in Calamba, Laguna, on May 13, 2019, within the Philippine general election, for posts of the mayor, vice mayor and twelve councilors. They will also elect their first representative of their newly-created lone congressional district.

Overview
The incumbent mayor, Justin Marc SB. Chipeco once again ran for mayoral post for the third consecutive time together with his running mate, the incumbent vice mayor Roseller Rizal. For the second time in a row, Rizal will run for vice mayoral position unopposed.

Results
The candidates for mayor and vice mayor with the highest number of votes win.
Candidates who are incumbent in the position they are running are in italic text.

Mayoral and vice mayoral elections

City Council elections
Voters elected twelve councilors to comprise the City Council or the Sangguniang Panlungsod. Candidates voted separately so winning candidates came from different political parties. The twelve candidates with the highest number of votes won the seats. Incumbent city councilors Edgardo Catindig, Moises Morales, Peewee Perez, and Santiago Atienza did not run as their respective terms are limited. Perez ran as provincial board member of the 2nd District of Laguna instead.

 

 
 
 
 
 
 

|-
|bgcolor=black colspan=5|

References

External links
 Official website of the Commission on Elections
  Official website of National Movement for Free Elections (NAMFREL)
 Official website of the Parish Pastoral Council for Responsible Voting (PPCRV)

Elections in Calamba, Laguna
2019 Philippine local elections
2019 elections in Calabarzon